Innocent means a lack of guilt with respect to any kind of crime, sin, or wrongdoing.

Innocent or The Innocent may also refer to:

People
 Innocent (name), a list of people with the given name and surname
 Pope Innocent (disambiguation)
 Saint Innocent (disambiguation)
 Innocent (actor) (born 1948), Indian actor and producer
 Innocent (Giesel) (c. 1600-1683), Prussian-born historian, writer, and political and ecclesiastic figure
 Innocent, Bishop of Syrmia (fl. 13th century)

Arts and entertainment

Films 
 Innocent (1918 film), an American silent film starring Fannie Ward
 Innocent (1921 film), a British silent drama film by Maurice Elvey
 The Innocent (1976 film), an Italian film by Luchino Visconti
 The Innocent (1985 film), a British drama by John Mackenzie
 The Innocent (1986 film), an Egyptian film
 The Innocent (1993 film), a spy thriller by John Schlesinger
 The Innocent (1994 film), an American television film featuring Kelsey Grammer
 Innocent (1999 film), a French drama by Costa Natsis
 Innocent (2009 film), an American action film by Aram Rappaport
 Innocent (2011 film), an America made-for-TV movie
 Inocente, a 2012 short documentary film directed by Sean Fine
 The Innocent (2022 film), a 2022 French drama film

Literature
 Innocent (manga), a 2013–2020 manga series by Shinichi Sakamoto
 Innocent (novel), a 2010 novel by Scott Turow
 Innocent: Her Fancy and His Fact, a 1914 novel by Marie Corelli
 The Innocent (Baldacci novel), a 2012 book by David Baldacci
 The Innocent (Coben novel), a 2005 novel by Harlan Coben
 The Innocent (Kim novel), a 1968 novel by Richard E. Kim
 The Innocent (McEwan novel), a 1990 novel by Ian McEwan
 The Innocent (play) a 1979 play by Tom McGrath

Music

Performers
 Les Innocents, a French rock band
 The Innocent (band), an American band of which Trent Reznor was formerly a member

Albums
 Innocent (EP), by Rainbow, 2015
 Innocent, an album by Sachi Tainaka, 2011

Songs
 "Innocent" (Alexander O'Neal song), 1985
 "Innocent" (Fuel song), 2000
 "Innocent" (Mike Oldfield song), 1989; covered by Groove Coverage, 2010
 "Innocent" (Our Lady Peace song), 2002
 "Innocent" (Stereophonics song), 2009
 "Innocent" (Taylor Swift song), 2010
 "Innocent", by Small Mercies from Beautiful Hum, 2008
 "Innocent", by Stellar Kart from Expect the Impossible, 2008
 "The Innocent", by Drivin' N' Cryin' from Fly Me Courageous, 1991
 "The Innocent", by Mayer Hawthorne from Where Does This Door Go, 2013

Labels
 Innocent Records, a British record label
 Innocent Records (Australia)

Television
 Innocent (TV series), a 2018 & 2021 British miniseries
 The Innocent (miniseries), a 2001 British miniseries
 The Innocent (TV series), a Spanish series on Netflix
 "Innocent" (CSI: Miami), an episode

Other uses
 Innocent Drinks, a drink manufacturer, majority owned by Coca-Cola

See also
 Innocence (disambiguation)
 The Innocents (disambiguation), including uses of Innocents
 Inocencio (disambiguation)
 Innocencio